Filkin Hill is a mountain in Albany County, New York. It is located east-northeast of Huntersland. East Hill is located west, Wolf Hill is located east-southeast, Cole Hill is located west, and Irish Hill is located west of Filkin Hill.

References

Mountains of Albany County, New York
Mountains of New York (state)